"Heartbreak Hotel" is a song by Elvis Presley.

Heartbreak Hotel may also refer to:

Arts, entertainment, and media

Films
Heartbreak Hotel (film), a 1988 American comedy film

Literature
Heartbreak Hotel, a 2017 Alex Delaware series novel by Jonathan Kellerman
Heartbreak Hotel, a 2013 novel by Deborah Moggach
Heartbreak Hotel, a 1976 novel by Anne Rivers Siddons
 Heartbreak Hotel, a 2018 play by Floyd Mutrux 
Heartbreak Hotel (comics), a 1987–88 "Lifestyle Comics Magazine" published by Willyprods / Small Time Ink

Music
"Heartbreak Hotel" (Whitney Houston song), 1998
"Heartbreak Hotel" (Yohio song), 2013
"Heartbreak Hotel", a song by Grieves from the 2011 album Together/Apart
"Heartbreak Hotel", a 2016 song by Tiffany Young, featuring Simon Dominic for SM Station
"Heartbreak Hotel", 2021 album by Phora
"This Place Hotel", a 1980 song by The Jacksons; originally titled "Heartbreak Hotel"

Television
"Heartbreak Hotel" (The Simpsons), episode of animated series The Simpsons
"Heartbreak Hotel" (Castle), an episode of the ABC show Castle
"Heartbreak Hotel" (Porridge), an episode of the BBC sitcom Porridge
"Heartbreak Hotel", an episode of Doctor Who Confidential from "The God Complex"

Other uses
Ramada Plaza JFK Hotel, New York hotel used several times to house relatives of airplane crash victims